Adelius clandestinus is a hymenopteran parasitoid in the family Braconidae. It is a solitary endoparasitoid of larvae of micromoths in the family Nepticulidae. It has also been reported from a cecidomyiid fly. It occurs from southern France to northern Sweden to the east coast of Russia.

Hosts
Ectoedemia louisella
Ectoedemia septembrella (on Hypericum perforatum)
Ectoedemia sericopeza
Rabdophaga rosaria
Stigmella obliquella

References

Braconidae
Parasitic wasps
Insects described in 1851